This is a list of television stations in Southeast Asia.

Brunei
Free-to-air television stations included:
RTB Perdana
RTB Aneka
RTB Sukmaindera

Cambodia
Free-to-air television stations include:

Channel 3 (Cambodia)
TV3 Asia
TV5 Cambodia
National Television of Cambodia
CTV9 (Cambodian Television Channel 9 or Channel 9)
Apsara TV
Cambodian Television Network (CTN)
Bayon Television
MYTV
CNC (Cambodia News Channel)
SEATV (Southeast Asian Television)
BTV News
ETV
PNN
CTV8HD (Cambodia)
Hang Meas HDTV (HMHDTV)
Raksmey Hang Meas HDTV (RHMHDTV)

Channels available on cable or satellite include:

Cambodia News Channel
CTN International
Hang Meas TV (HMTV)
PPCTV Channel 6
PPCTV Channel 9
PPCTV Channel 10
PPCTV Movie 1
PPCTV Sport
One TV Karaoke
One TV Cinema
One TV Sabay

East Timor
Free-to-air television channels include:

Radio-Televisão Timor Leste
GMN TV SD/HD
RTM Maubere
Dhili TV

Channels available on cable or satellite include:

RTP Internacional

Indonesia

Major national free-to-air television networks include:

 Government-owned (through LPP TVRI)
 TVRI (digital-based)
 TVRI World (digital-based)
 TVRI Sport (digital-based)
 MNC (through MNC Media)
 RCTI
 MNCTV
 GTV
 iNews
 Emtek (through Surya Citra Media)
 SCTV
 Indosiar
 Moji (digital-based)
 Mentari TV (digital-based)
 Bakrie Group (through Visi Media Asia)
 ANTV (ownership through Intermedia Capital)
 tvOne
 VTV (digital-based)
 Media Group
 Metro TV
 Magna Channel (digital-based)
 BN Channel (digital-based)
 CT Corp (through Trans Media)
 Trans TV
 Trans7
 CNN Indonesia (digital-based, license from Warner Bros. Discovery)
 CNBC Indonesia (digital-based, license from Comcast through NBCUniversal)
 Kompas Gramedia (through KG Media)
 Kompas TV
 Rajawali Corpora
 RTV
 Indika Group (through Net Visi Media)
 NET.
 Mayapada Group
 MYTV (analog only)
 B Universe
 BTV (digital-based)

Minor and regional national free-to-air television networks include:

 Jawa Pos Group
 JTV (covering East Java)
 JPM (covering Jabodetabek and Banten)
 Jawa Pos TV (digital-based, covering Java (especially in Surabaya, Madiun, Jabodetabek, Semarang and Cianjur), and also Bali)
 TA Media Group
 TATV (digital-based, covering Surakarta, Yogyakarta and Semarang)
 Yayasan Buddha Tzu Chi Indonesia
 DAAI TV (covering Jabodetabek and Medan)
 BBS Group
 BBS TV (digital-based, covering East Java and Jabodetabek)
 Inspira Media
 Inspira TV (digital-based, covering Bandung, Jabodetabek, and Yogyakarta)
 NT Corp
 Nusantara TV (digital-based, covering Jabodetabek, Bandung, Yogyakarta, Surakarta, Medan, Batam, Bandar Lampung and Bali)
 Harum TV (digital-based, covering Bandar Lampung and Bali)
 Gold TV (digital-based, covering Bandar Lampung and Bali)
 Bhineka TV (digital-based, covering Bandar Lampung and Bali)
 Cuiss Creative
 E Channel (digital-based, covering Jabodetabek, Yogyakarta, Surakarta, Medan, and Banjarmasin)

Television station groups

 CTV Networks
 CTV Banten
 Bali Post Media Group
 Indonesia Network
 STTV

Channels available on satellite include:

1. Non-profit (government-owned) satellite channels

 LPP RRI
 RRI NET
 Ministry of Communication and Information Technology (Kominfo RI)
 GPR TV
 People's Representative Council (DPR-RI)
 TVR Parlemen (through TV Parlemen)

2. For profit satellite channels

 Ahsan TV
 Akhyar TV
 Ajwa TV
 Al-Bahjah TV
 Al-Iman TV
 AQL TV
 Ashiil TV
 Aswaja TV
 Bali United TV
 Dakta TV
 Drakor Plus
 Fatwa TV
 Garuda TV
 Hidup TV
 Hope Channel
 Insan TV
 K-Drama
 Kugo 1
 KugoStar
 Lejel Home Shopping
 Maleo TV
 MTA TV
 Nabawi TV
 Nada Muslim TV
 Niaga TV
 Persija TV
 Puldapii TV
 Rasyaad TV
 Reformed 21
 Rodja TV
 Salam TV
 Saling Sapa TV
 Sinema Indonesia
 Spacetoon
 Spacetoon Plus
 Surau TV
 TVP
 TV Desa
 TV MUI
 U-Channel
 Ummat TV
 Wesal TV

Laos
Free-to-air television channels include:

Lao National Television (LNTV1, LNTV3)
Lao Public Security Television (LAO PSTV)
TV Lao

Channels available on cable or satellite include:
Lao Star Channel
MV Lao

Malaysia

Free-to-air television channels include:

 TV1 (available on Astro/NJOI/Unifi TV/MYTV channel 101)
 TV2 (available on Astro/NJOI/Unifi TV/MYTV channel 102)
 TV3 (available on Astro/NJOI/Unifi TV/MYTV channel 103)
 TV Alhijrah (available on Astro/NJOI/Unifi TV/MYTV channel 114)
 DidikTV KPM (available on Astro/NJOI channel 147 and Unifi TV/MYTV channel 107)
 8TV (available on Astro/NJOI channel 148 and Unifi TV/MYTV channel 108)
 TV9 (available on Astro/NJOI channel 149 and Unifi TV/MYTV channel 109)

Free-to-air digital television channels include:

 TV Okey (available on Astro/NJOI channel 146 and MYTV channel 110)
 Bernama TV (available on Astro/NJOI channel 502, Unifi TV channel 631 and MYTV channel 121)
 Sukan RTM (available on MYTV channel 111)
 Berita RTM (available on MYTV channel 123)
 TVS (available on Astro and MYTV channel 122)
 Drama Sangat HD (available only on tonton)
 Oh!Bulan HD (available only on tonton)
 Wowshop (available only on MYTV channels 104 and 106)
 SUKE TV (available only on MYTV channel 116)
 SUKE SHOP (available only on MYTV channel 120)
 Awesome TV (available on MYTV channel 112 and Astro channel 123)
 TV Pertiwi (available only on MYTV channel 125)
 UKAS TV (available only on MYTV channel 126)
 TV6 (available only on MYTV channel 113)

Myanmar
Free-to-air television channels include:

MRTV
Myawaddy TV
MITV (Myanmar International television)
Famer Channel
Mahar Bawdi
Readers Channel
Hluttaw
For Edu
NRC
MRTV Sport
MRTV-4
MRTV-4 HD
Channel-7 (Myanmar)
Channel-7 HD (Myanmar)
DVB (Democratic Voice of Burma)
Mizzima TV
Channel K
YTV
Fortune TV

Channels available on cable or satellite include:

MRTV
DVB (Democratic Voice of Burma)
MITV (Myanmar International television)
MRTV-4
MRTV-4 HD
Channel-7 (Myanmar)
Channel-7 HD (Myanmar)
 MRTV Entertainment

Philippines
Regional, provincial or local

Currently, there are two (2) major TV networks in the Philippines, and three government-owned networks.

Major television networks
 GMA Network
 TV5 Network
Pre-Major television networks
 ZOE Broadcasting Network (currently airs A2Z (Philippine TV channel))
 GTV (Philippine TV network) (formerly Citynet 27, EMC, Channel V Philippines, QTV/GMA News TV)
Government-owned television networks
 People's Television Network (PTV) (flagship state broadcaster)
 Radio Philippines Network (RPN) (20% minority share; currently carries CNN Philippines)
 Intercontinental Broadcasting Corporation (IBC)

Minor television networks
 BEAM TV
 RJTV
 Net 25
 UNTV
 All TV

Singapore

Channel 5
Suria
Channel U
CNA
Channel 8 
Vasantham

Thailand

Free-to-air television stations include:

Channel 3 (digital TV station owned by BEC-Multimedia since 2014)
Channel 5
Channel 7
Modernine TV 
NBT
Thai PBS (formerly ITV and )

Digital Free-to-air television stations include:

Channel 3 Family
MCOT Family
LOCA TV
TNN 16
Thai TV
JKN 18
Spring News
Bright TV
Voice TV
Workpoint TV
True4U
GMM 25
Spring 26
Channel 8
Channel 3 SD
Mono 29
One 31
Thairath TV
Amarin TV
PPTV

Channels available on cable or satellite include:

ABtv 1 (national channel)
ABtv 2 (variety channel)
ABtv 3 (financial channel)
ABtv 4 (Thai Buddhist channel)
News1
Farwanmai
Distance Learning TV
Earth One (TV channel)
EDN Edutainment
ETV (Thailand) (Educational Television Ministry of Education)
Faikham TV
Filmagix Asia
Grand Prix Channel
ILearn
Joy TV
MV TV
MV TV 2
Miracle Channel
Mongkol Channel
Money Channel
NBT World (owner by National News Bureau of Thailand)
NRI
Police TV
Pop Channel
Rak Thai TV
Sabaidee TV Live
sky NEWS Thai
Smile Movies 1
Smile Movies 2
Sportsline
 Super Cheng
TGN

Channels available on TrueVisions include:

True AF
True Select
SME Shop Channel
True Film Asia
True Inside
True Series
True Asian Series
True Spark
SuperSport
SuperSport Action
True Sport Plus
True Zoccer
True X-Zyte
True Explore 1
True Explore 2
True Explore 3
True Movie Hits
True Hay Ha
True Music

Other channels run by True Visions include:

TNN 16
TNN 2
Channel V Thailand
Chic Channel
Money Channel
TH-TV (Thailand's tourist channel)
HBO Asia
Cinemax
Fox Movies Premium
Diva Universal
AXN Asia
Discovery Channel
Animal Planet
Cartoon Network
CNN International
BBC World News
Channel NewsAsia
CNBC Asia
TV5
CCTV-4
NHK
MGM
E!

Channels run by the Smile TV Network include:

VH1 Thailand
Nickelodeon
Moviemania
Popper
Rakthai TV
Panorama TV

Vietnam

VTV – National public broadcaster, operates ten channels and dozen Pay TV channels network: 
VTV1 - News and current affairs
VTV2 - Education, Science and Sports
VTV3 - Sports and Entertainment
VTV4 - International Channel
VTV5 - Ethnic language (and VTV5 Southeast, VTV5 Central Highland)
VTV6 - Sports
VTV7 - Education and Children
VTV8 - Central Highland and Central Region 
VTV9 - Southeast Region
VTV Cần Thơ - Southwest Region
Al Jazeera
Al Jazeera English
Al Jazeera Mubasher
Animal Planet Asia
Animax
AXN
Arirang TV
Asian Food Network
Australia Network
Warner TV
Baby TV
BBC Earth
BBC Lifestyle
BBC World News
Boomerang Asia
Cartoon Network Asia
Cartoonito
CBeebies
CCTV-4 Asia
CGTN
CGTN Arabic
CGTN Documentary
CGTN French
CGTN Russian
CGTN Spanish
Channel NewsAsia
Channel One International
Cinemax Asia
CNBC Asia
CNN International
Da Vinci Kids
Discovery Channel Asia
Discovery Asia
DMAX
DreamWorks Channel
DW-TV
FashionTV
France 24
HBO Asia
HGTV
History Channel
KBS World
KIX
NHK World Japan
NHK World Premium
Nick Jr.
Outdoor Channel
Press TV
Rai Italia Asia
RTP Internacional
Rock Entertainment
Rock Action
TLC Asia
TRT World
TV5 Monde Asie
TVE Internacional
WION
Dr. Fit
BOX HITS
BOX Movie¹
Happy Kids
HITS
Hollywood Classics
IN THE BOX Channel
Music Box
MAN
Planet Earth
WOMAN
SKTV Sports 1
SKTV Sports 2
SKTV Sports 3
SKTV Sports 4
VTVCab – The first Vietnamese cable pay television network (18 special channels are produced by VTVcab)
ON Sports Network (by VTVCab) 5 special channels
SCTV (Vietnam) – Saigontourist Cable Television - broadcasts many different pay channels. Among them, there are 23 channels produced by SCTV ( SCTV1 -> SCTV22 SCTV Phim tổng hợp)
K+ (VSTV) – Satellite Television (K+ CINE, K+ SPORT 2, K+ SPORT 1, K+ LIFE, K+ KIDS)
ANTV (People's Police Television), VOV TV (Voice of Vietnam), Quốc Hội TV (National Assembly Television), QPVN (Vietnam National Defence Television), TTXVN (Vietnam News Agency), Nhân Dân TV (Nhân Dân Television)
Ho Chi Minh City TV – The first TV station in Vietnam, includes 8 free-to-air channels:
HTV7 (HD/SD) - Entertainment and Sports
HTV9 (HD/SD) - News, Entertainment and Sports
HTV1 - Information
HTV2 - Entertainment 
HTV3 - Youth Channel
HTV Key - Education 
HTV Thể Thao - Sports
HTV co.op - Shopping
HTVC – Ho Chi Minh City Cable Television - 8 pay channels (HTVC Thuần Việt, HTVC Gia Đình, HTVC Phụ Nữ, HTVC Phim, HTVC Du lịch, HTVC Ca Nhạc, HTVC+, HTVC Mua Sấm)
VTC – National digital broadcaster, includes many different 15 channels
62 provincial television stations

See also

 Lists of television channels
 List of television stations in East Asia
 List of television stations in South Asia
 List of television stations in Central Asia
 List of television stations in Western Asia

References

Southeast Asia
Mass media in Southeast Asia
Southeast Asia-related lists